Galina Napoleonovna Urbanovich (September 5, 1917 – May 8, 2011) was a Soviet Olympic gymnast. She won a gold and silver medal at the 1952 Helsinki games. She was seven times all-around gymnastics champion of the USSR. Her achievements earned her the Honoured Master of Sports of the USSR award. She was from a Lithuanian family.

In 2016, she was elected to the International Jewish Sports Hall of Fame.

References

External links

1917 births
2011 deaths
Sportspeople from Baku
People from Baku Governorate
Soviet female artistic gymnasts
Olympic gymnasts of the Soviet Union
Olympic gold medalists for the Soviet Union
Olympic silver medalists for the Soviet Union
Gymnasts at the 1952 Summer Olympics
Honoured Masters of Sport of the USSR
Recipients of the Order of the Red Banner of Labour
Olympic medalists in gymnastics
Medalists at the 1952 Summer Olympics
International Jewish Sports Hall of Fame inductees